Colonel Bonny Serrano Avenue (also spelled Boni Serrano Avenue), formerly named and still referred to as Santolan Road, is a major east–west thoroughfare in the Eastern Manila District of Metro Manila, Philippines, running between San Juan and Quezon City. It forms the northern limit of San Juan and the southern limit of Quezon City's New Manila and Cubao districts and links the Philippine National Police headquarters in Camp Crame with the Armed Forces of the Philippines headquarters in Camp Aguinaldo. The avenue runs from the border of barangays Corazón de Jesús, St. Joseph (Halo-Halo), Pasadena, and Little Baguio in San Juan in the west to barangays Libís and Blue Ridge B near Quezon City's border with Marikina in the east. It was named after the decorated Korean War hero, Venancio "Bonny" Serrano.

Route description

The four-lane avenue begins as a continuation of Pinaglabanan Street at P. Guevarra Street in the Corazon De Jesus area of San Juan. It proceeds due east and runs through the boundary between barangays Bagong Lipunan ng Crame in Quezon City and West Crame in San Juan, passing through the San Juan Municipal Cemetery before arriving at the northern side of Camp Crame. East of the Epifanio de los Santos Avenue junction, the avenue runs the northern boundary of Camp Aguinaldo with the barangays Socorro, San Roque, and Bayanihan, and intersecting with 15th Avenue at Camp Aguinaldo Gate 1. It then intersects with Katipunan Avenue (C-5) via an overpass, passing through barangays Blue Ridge A, Blue Ridge B, and Saint Ignatius before terminating at Eulogio Rodriguez Jr. Avenue (C-5) in Libis near Camp Atienza where it continues as FVR Road all the way to the Marikina–Infanta Highway in Calumpang, Marikina and Santolan, Pasig. This section of the avenue connecting Katipunan and Eulogio Rodriguez Jr. Avenues is designated as a component of Circumferential Road 5 (C-5) and National Route 11 (N11), while its section from EDSA to Katipunan Avenue is designated as National Route 185 (N185).

The Avenue is a problematic major road that has frequent traffic jams.

History
Bonny Serrano Avenue was formerly called the Carretera de Santolan (Santolan Road) which ran from the Santolan pumping station on the Mariquina River to El Deposito water reservoir in San Juan del Monte, the main source of water for Manila residents during the Spanish colonial period. It was built around 1901 during the early years of the American colonial period at a cost of $150 (150 pesos). In 1935, the road, also known as the San Juan–Santolan Road and San Juan–Santolan Pumping Station Road, became the location of Camp Murphy, home of the United States Army Philippine Department, and eventually the Philippine Commonwealth Army, which was named after then Governor-General Frank Murphy. The military camp eventually became Camp Aguinaldo and Camp Crame when the Philippines gained independence after World War II. The road was then renamed after Colonel Bonny Merioles Serrano in 1970, three months after the war hero's death.

Intersections

References

Streets in Metro Manila
Streets in Quezon City
San Juan, Metro Manila